Vietnamese people in Turkey are one of the very small overseas Vietnamese communities. Mostly living in Istanbul and Ankara and working at the Vietnamese embassy, their total population is unknown, but estimates said that it can be more than 2,000.

See also 
 Overseas Vietnamese

External links  
 Embassy of Turkey at Hanoi. (Turkish) (English)
 Embassy of Vietnam in Ankara (Vietnamese)
 Embassy of Vietnam in Ankara (English)

Turkey